Dixie (also Polly Town) is an unincorporated community in Whitley County, Kentucky, United States.

Notes

Unincorporated communities in Whitley County, Kentucky
Unincorporated communities in Kentucky